Nicholas Cicek (born May 29, 2000) is a Canadian-Turkish professional ice hockey defenceman for the San Jose Barracuda in the American Hockey League (AHL) while under contract to the San Jose Sharks of the National Hockey League (NHL).

Playing career
Cicek originally played junior hockey in his home province of Winnipeg before he was selected in the seventh-round, 149th overall, of the 2015 WHL Bantam Draft by the Portland Winterhawks. He played the Winnipeg Wild in the Manitoba U-18 'AAA' Hockey League (MMHL) and Winnipeg Blues of the Manitoba Junior Hockey League (MJHL) before making his major junior debut with Portland.

He appeared in parts of four season with the Winterhawks in the Western Hockey League (WHL), captaining the club in his final season in 2020–21, while notching career highs in assists and points despite the shortened COVID-19 affected campaign.

As an undrafted free agent and having completed his junior career, Cicek signalled the beginning of his professional career in signing a one-year AHL contract with the San Jose Barracuda on May 20, 2021. He immediately joined the Barracuda on an amateur try-out contract for the remainder of the 2020–21 season.

In his first full professional season in 2021–22, Cicek continued his late-blooming development in quickly establishing himself within the Barracuda blueline to finish second in points and finish 9th in league scoring among rookie defenceman with 5 goals and 25 points through 53 regular season games. On April 12, 2022, Cicek was signed to his first NHL contract after agreeing to a two-year, entry-level deal with the Barracuda's affiliate, the San Jose Sharks.

Cicek was reassigned by the Sharks to continue with the Barracuda to begin the  season. After 10 scoreless games with the Barracuda, Cicek received his first recall to the NHL on November 15, 2022. He immediately made his NHL debut with the Sharks that night, playing in a top-four pairing role in a 5–2 defeat against the Vegas Golden Knights. In just his second game, he registered his first point, an assist on a goal to Matt Nieto, during a 7–4 defeat to the Detroit Red Wings on November 17, 2022.

Personal
Cicek's father, Nazim, is from Turkey and he holds both Canadian and Turkish citizenship. He played for Turkey in the 2017 European Youth Olympic Festival when he was 16. Cicek's younger brother, Michael, plays major junior hockey with the Spokane Chiefs in the WHL.

Career statistics

Awards and honours

References

External links
 

2000 births
Living people
Portland Winterhawks players
San Jose Barracuda players
San Jose Sharks players
Undrafted National Hockey League players